May District may refer to:

May District, Kazakhstan
May District, Laos

See also 
 May (disambiguation)